Thinkal Muthal Velli Vare ( Monday to Friday) is a 2015 Indian Malayalam-language comedy film, produced by Anto Joseph and directed by Kannan Thamarakkulam. The film stars Jayaram in lead role with, Anoop Menon, Singer Rimi Tomy, Rachana Narayanankutty, Sasi Kalinga, Maniyanpilla Raju, Rachana Narayanankutty, Edavela Babu, K. P. A. C. Lalitha, and K. B. Ganesh Kumar in supporting roles.

Synopsis
Scriptwriter Jayadevan Chunkathara marries the village girl Pushpavalli, who is a diehard fan of his serials. Their married life results in a number of humorous incidents for both of them

Cast 

 Jayaram as Jayadevan Chungathara
 Anoop Menon as Vijaya Anand
 Janardhanan as Rtd. Col. Viswanatha Menon
 Rimi Tomy as Pushpavalli
 Rachana Narayanankutty as Arundhathi / Jalaja
 K. B. Ganesh Kumar as Sabari
 Idavela Babu as Ramesh
 Anoop Chandran as Suresh
 Sasi Kalinga as Black Magician
 Saju Navodaya as Jayadevan's Helper
 Maniyanpilla Raju as C. I. Dhanapalan
 Geetha Salam as Pushpavalli's Uncle
 K.P.A.C. Lalitha as Jayadevan's Grandmother
 Viji Chandrasekhar as Jayadevan's mother
 Muthumani as Vanaja
 Ambika Mohan as Pushapavalli's Aunt
 Aiswarya Rajeev as Shobha
 Anu as Pushpavalli's friend
 Bindu Aneesh as Rohini
Sangeetha Shivan as Host
 Spadikam George 

Cameos

 Aliyar as himself
 Amith as himself
 Boban Samuel as himself
 Deepan as himself
 G. K. Pillai as himself
 Jayakumar Pillai as himself
 Kishore as himself
 Sajan Surya as himself
 Kochaniyan as himself
 Kollam Shah as himself
 Kottayam Pradeep as himself
 Manoj Pillai as himself
 Poojappura Radhakrishnan as himself
 Rajasenan as himself
 Thulasidas as himself
 Vanchiyoor Praveen Kumar as himself
 Vivek Gopan as himself
 Anila Sreekumar as herself
 Aparna P Nair as herself
 Archana Suseelan as herself
 Beena Antony as herself
 Charutha Baiju as herself
 Chithra Shenoy as herself
 Dimple Rose as herself
 Gayathri as herself
 Indulekha as herself
 Jija Surendran as herself
 Kanya Bharathi as herself
 Kavitha Lakshmi as herself
 Kezia Joseph as herself
 Leena Nair as herself
 Lakshmi Priya as herself
 Meera Muralidharan as herself
 Nisha Sarang as herself
 Prabha as herself
 Pratheeksha G Pradeep as herself
 Priyanka Anoop as herself
 Ramyasree as herself
 Sangeetha Mohan as herself
 Souparnika as herself
 Sreedevi Anil as herself
 Sreekala Sasidharan as herself
 Sumi Santhosh as herself
 Sunitha as herself
 Surya Mohan as herself
 TT Usha as herself
 Yamuna Mahesh as herself

Music
All songs were composed by Sanand George.

References

External links 
 

2015 films
2010s Malayalam-language films
Films directed by Kannan Thamarakkulam